The Pressure Equipment Directive (PED) 2014/68/EU (formerly 97/23/EC) of the EU sets out the standards for the design and fabrication of pressure equipment ("pressure equipment" means steam boilers, pressure vessels, piping, safety valves and other components and assemblies subject to pressure loading) generally over one litre in volume and having a maximum pressure more than 0.5 bar gauge. It also sets the administrative procedures requirements for the "conformity assessment" of pressure equipment, for the free placing on the European market without local legislative barriers. It has been mandatory throughout the EU since 30 May 2002, with 2014 revision fully effective as of 19 July 2016. The standards and regulations regarding pressure vessels and boiler safety are also very close to the US standards defined by the American Society of Mechanical Engineers (ASME). This enables most international inspection agencies to provide both verification and certification services to assess compliance to the different pressure equipment directives. From the pressure vessel manufactures PED does not generally require a prior manufacturing permit/certificate/stamp as ASME does.

Contents
 Scope and Definitions (including exemptions of its scope)
 Market surveillance
 Technical requirements: classification of pressure equipment according to type and content.
 Free movement
 Presumption of conformity
 Committee on technical standards and regulations
 Committee on Pressure Equipment
 Safeguard clause
 Classification of pressure equipment
 Conformity assessment
 European approval for materials
 Notified bodies
 Recognized third-party organisations
 User inspectorates
 CE marking
 Unduly affixed CE marking
 International co-operation
 Decisions entailing refusal or restriction
 Repeal
 Transposition and transitional provisions
 Addressees of the Directive: the EU member states for implementation in national laws and/or regulations.

 Annex I: Essential safety requirements
 General
 Design
 Manufacturing
 Materials
 Fired or otherwise heated pressure equipment with a risk of overheating (article 3.1)
 Piping
 Specific quantitative requirements for certain pressure equipment
 Appendix II: Conformity assessment tables. Actually diagrams of pressure vs. volume (or diameter for pipes), for classification of equipment in four classes.
 Appendix III: Conformity assessment procedures
 Appendix IV: Minimum criteria to be met when designating the notified bodies (article 12) and the recognised third party organisations (article 13)
 Appendix V: Criteria to be met when authorising user inspectorates (article 14)
 Appendix VI: CE marking
 Appendix VII: Declaration of conformity

Transition to Directive 2014/68/EU
Directive 97/23/EC was fully superseded by directive 2014/68/EU from 20 July 2016 onwards. Article 13 of the new directive (classification of pressure equipment) became effective 1 June 2015, replacing article 9 of directive 97/23/EC.

UK implementation
In the UK the Pressure Equipment Regulations 1999 (PER) and the Pressure Systems Safety Regulations 2000 apply: see Health and safety regulations in the United Kingdom. The Health and Safety Executive and the Health and Safety Executive for Northern Ireland are the named enforcement authorities.

See also
 Pressure vessel
 EN 13445

References

External links 
 Directive 2014/68/EU of the European Parliament (Pressure Equipment Directive)
 Essential links for CE Marking in the UK

Engineering equipment
European Union directives
Gas technologies
Pressure vessels
Structural engineering standards
1997 in law
1997 in the European Union
2014 in law
2014 in the European Union